The United States of America (USA), represented by the United States Olympic Committee (USOC), competed at the 2008 Summer Olympics in Beijing, China. U.S. athletes have competed in every Summer Olympic Games in the modern era, except the 1980 Summer Olympics in Moscow, which was boycotted by the American team and many others in protest of the Soviet invasion of Afghanistan. The USOC sent a total of 588 athletes to Beijing (310 men and 286 women), and competed in all Olympic sports except handball.

The USOC selected San Jose State University in San Jose, California, as the primary processing center for all Team USA members headed for Beijing 2008. They flew into San Jose via San Jose International Airport or San Francisco International Airport for at least two days of document checks, health examinations, cultural briefings, portrait sittings, uniform fittings, and last-minute workout sessions.

The U.S. did not win the most gold medals for the first time in a Summer Games since 1992, with China being the country that won the most golds (48–36).  The United States never led the medal table during the games. However, the U.S. won its most medals ever (112) in a games not held on home soil, had the highest total medal count, and won more silver and bronze medals than any other participating nation. This games also saw a gold medal record for U.S. swimmer Michael Phelps, who won 8 golds surpassing Mark Spitz's record of 7 golds in a single Olympic event in 1972. Phelps also surpassed Spitz, Larisa Latynina of the USSR, Paavo Nurmi of Finland, and U.S. sprinter Carl Lewis to become the current record holder for the most Olympic gold medals (14).

The United States also saw milestones in women's swimming. Natalie Coughlin won 6 medals in Beijing, the most for a female Olympic swimmer. Dara Torres, who won 3 silver medals after her eight-year absence, became the oldest Olympic swimmer to win a medal, at age 41.

Gymnast Nastia Liukin became the third U.S. female to win a gold medal in individual all-around event. It was also a successful Olympics for U.S. team-based sports, as men's and women's basketball teams both won gold, as did men's volleyball, men and women's beach volleyball, women's soccer, women's eight in rowing, and the men's and women's 4 × 400 meter-relay teams. The US won silver and bronze medals in several other team events; women's volleyball, softball, baseball, both men's and women's team gymnastics, men's fencing sabre team, women's fencing foil team, and both men's and women's water polo.

Medalists

The following U.S. competitors won medals at the games. In the by discipline sections below, medalists' names are bolded.

|  style="text-align:left; width:78%; vertical-align:top;"|

|  style="text-align:left; width:22%; vertical-align:top;"|

* - Indicates the athlete competed in preliminaries but not the final

Won all medals in one event
 Women's sabre
 Men's 400 m
 Men's 400 m hurdles
Won all gold medals in one sport
 Basketball (2 gold)
 Beach volleyball (2 gold)
Won gold medals in both men's and women's events
 100 m backstroke
 4 × 400 meter relay

Archery

The United States men's archery team took sixth place at the 2007 World Outdoor Target Championships, earning the nation a full complement of three qualification spots for the Olympic men's competitions. The women's team finished in eleventh place, not qualifying the team. Jennifer Nichols earned a spot via individual qualification in that tournament. Karen Scavotto earned the United States another women's spot by finishing second in the Pan American championship.

The United States announced its Olympic team on May 5, 2008, following a national selection tournament. The women's roster included 2004 Olympian Jennifer Nichols and three-time Olympian Khatuna Lorig, who previously represented the Unified Team (1992) and Georgia (1996 and 2000) at the Olympics. On the men's side, first-time Olympian Brady Ellison joined four-time Olympian Butch Johnson and two-time Olympian Vic Wunderle.

Men

Athletics (track and field)

The 2008 U.S. Olympic Track & Field Trials were held in Eugene, Oregon, at the University of Oregon's Hayward Field from June 27 through July 6, 2008. Hayward Field had previously hosted the U.S. Olympic Trials in 1972, 1976 and 1980.

Men
Track & road events

Field events

Combined events – Decathlon

Women
Track & road events

Field events

Combined events – Heptathlon

* The athlete who finished in second place, Lyudmila Blonska of the Ukraine, tested positive for a banned substance. On August 22, Blonska was stripped of her medal and Hyleas Fountain was upgraded to silver.

Badminton

The United States was represented in four out of the five badminton events: men's singles, men's doubles, women's singles and women's doubles. The U.S. had qualified a mixed doubles team, but the Badminton World Federation rescinded the slot. No American has ever medaled in badminton since it became an Olympic sport in 1992, although Howard Bach and Bob Malaythong became the first Americans to reach the quarter-finals.

Baseball

The United States earned a qualification spot in baseball by placing in the top two at the 2006 Americas Olympic Qualifying Event. This marked the return of the United States national baseball team to the Olympics after not qualifying in 2004; the United States had appeared in all three of the official baseball tournaments, and nearly all of the exhibition and demonstration events, before then. The American team sought its second gold medal in the sport, but finished winning the bronze.

Baseball was open only to male amateurs in 1992 and 1996. As a result, the Americans and other nations where professional baseball is developed relied on collegiate players, while Cubans used their most experienced veterans, who technically were considered amateurs as they nominally held other jobs, but in fact trained full-time. In 2000, pros were admitted, but the MLB refused to release its players in 2000, 2004, and 2008, and the situation changed only a little: the Cubans still used their best players, while the Americans started using minor leaguers. The IOC cited the absence of the best players as the main reason for baseball being dropped from the Olympic program.

Summary

Team roster and tournament statistics

USA Baseball named its Olympic roster on July 16, 2008. The Olympic team was made up of professionals not on a Major League Baseball 25-man roster at the time of the tournament, because the MLB once again refused to take an Olympic break. The IOC named that as one of the reasons for removing baseball from the program.

Manager: Davey Johnson, Bob Watson (General Manager)

Coaches: Marcel Lachemann – Pitching Coach, Reggie Smith – Hitting Coach, Rick Eckstein – 3rd Base Coach, Dick Cooke – Auxiliary Coach, Rolando de Armas – Auxiliary Coach.

             

           

Group stage
All times are China Standard Time (UTC+8)

Preliminary round summary
The top four teams advanced to the semifinal round.

Semifinal

Bronze medal match

Basketball

The United States earned qualification spots for both men's and women's basketball by winning the FIBA Americas Championship 2007 and the FIBA Americas Championship for Women 2007.

The women's team successfully defended their 2004 Olympic championship against Australia in the gold medal game for the third consecutive Olympics. The victory allowed Lisa Leslie to join former teammate Teresa Edwards as the only basketball players to win four Olympic gold medals. After a disappointing third-place finish in Athens, the men's team adopted the name "Redeem Team." In the gold medal match, they beat 2006 FIBA World Champion Spain to give the U.S. its first gold medal in men's international competition in eight years.

Summary

Men's tournament

Roster

Group play

Quarterfinals

Semifinals

Gold medal match

Women's tournament

Roster

Group play

Quarterfinals

Semifinals

Gold medal match

Boxing

The United States qualified nine boxers for the Olympic boxing tournament. Five boxers (Yanez, Warren, Russell, Williams and Andrade) earned their spots at the 2007 World Championships. Ali, Molina and Wilder qualified at the first American qualifying tournament. Estrada was the last American boxer to qualify, doing so at the second American tournament. The United States did not qualify in light heavyweight or super heavyweight classes.

The U.S. boxing team suffered several early setbacks from which it never recovered. Alternate Boyd Melson withdrew with an injury. Before they arrived in Beijing, U.S. boxers were reportedly unhappy with training methods, coaching, and travel restrictions. On August 8, 2008, two-time national champion and bantamweight boxer Gary Russell Jr. forcibly withdrew from the Olympics after collapsing before his weigh-in. Under International Amateur Boxing Federation rules, the U.S. was not permitted to select another boxer to take his place. Reigning flyweight world champion Raushee Warren, America's best hope for gold, lost his opening bout to Lee Ok-Sung of South Korea. In the end, the U.S. left Beijing with one bronze won by Deontay Wilder, its worst performance in Olympic history. The U.S. had previously won a single silver in 1948 and no medals in 1908 and 1980, when it did not send a boxing team. On September 5, 2008, Dan Campbell, the national director of coaching for USA Boxing, resigned.

Canoeing

Slalom
The Augsburg World Cup event on July 6 served as the final selection event for the Canoe-Kayak Slalom team. The United States qualified in all four slalom events and sent five people to compete in the slalom races.

Sprint
The United States qualified in three out of twelve flatwater events and sent two people – one man and one woman – to compete in the flatwater sprint events at the 2008 Summer Olympics. The U.S. has not medaled in Olympic flatwater canoe and kayak racing since 1992.

Qualification Legend: QS = Qualify to semi-final; QF = Qualify directly to final

Cycling

Most of the United States’ cycling squad was announced on July 1, 2008. The team sent competitors in all four disciplines – BMX, mountain biking, road racing and track racing. The final three members of the team were announced on July 10.

Road
Men

Women

Track
Sprint

Pursuit

Keirin

Omnium

Mountain biking

BMX

Diving

The United States finalized its nomination process for the Olympic diving squad on July 7, 2008. For the first time since 1996, the U.S. diving team qualified for all individual and synchronized events. It became a major power in the Olympics from 1904 to 2000, winning 47 of 90 gold medals, but left out of the medals for the second consecutive Olympics.

Men

Women

Equestrian

On July 15, 2008, the United States Equestrian Federation (USEF) named the rider/horse combinations for the 2008 U.S. Olympic Team. The horses were shipped to England on July 17, placed under quarantine on July 22, 2008, and shipped to Hong Kong for the Olympic Games on July 30, 2008. Before the start of the games, Heidi White-Carty and her horse Northern Spy withdrew from the U.S. eventing team because of a veterinary issue. Karen O'Connor and her horse Mandiba took their place on the team.

The U.S. successfully defended its gold medal from Athens in the team jumping competition.

Dressage

Eventing

# - Indicates that points do not count in team total
* Phillip Dutton qualified for the final show jumping event round on 68.2 faults (sixteenth place) and jumped a clear round to move up to twelfth place, but was disqualified because weighted boots worn by his horse exceeded the maximum limit.

Jumping

* Will Simpson received a qualifying score, but the US already had three other riders in the individual final.

Fencing

The 2008 United States Olympic Fencing Team was announced on June 11, 2008. After the 1904 Olympics, the United States did not win an Olympic fencing gold medal until 2004. But on the first full day of Olympic competition, Mariel Zagunis, Sada Jacobson and Becca Ward swept the fencing event in women's individual saber; it was the first American sweep of an Olympic fencing event since 1904. The U.S. left Beijing with a total of six medals.

Men

Women

Field hockey

For the first time since the 1996 Summer Olympics, the United States sent a women's field hockey team to the Olympics. The team was announced on July 3 and consisted of 16 women. The men's team failed to qualify for the Beijing games.

Summary

Women's tournament

Roster

Group play

7th place match

Soccer (football) 

The United States earned spots in Beijing for both men's and women's soccer by advancing to the finals of the CONCACAF Pre-Olympic Tournaments in March and April 2008. For the Olympic tournament, the full women's national team and the men's under-23 team (including three players over the age of 23, as per FIFA regulations) participated. The 18-player roster for the 2008 U.S. Olympic women's soccer team was announced on June 23, 2008. In the final match before the Olympics on July 16, the women's team lost leading scorer Abby Wambach after she broke her left leg in a collision with Brazilian defender Andréia Rosa. Lauren Cheney, originally selected as an alternate, replaced Wambach on the roster. The 18-player roster for the 2008 U.S. Olympic Men's Soccer Team was announced on July 17, 2008. After aggravating a hamstring injury, defender Nathan Sturgis was replaced by midfielder Dax McCarty on the Olympic roster July 24, 2008.

Despite playing without Wambach and an early first-round loss to Norway, the women's soccer team successfully defended their 2004 gold medal against Brazil in overtime; it was the third gold medal overall for the United States in women's soccer. The team had lost its previous match against Brazil 4–0 in the semifinals of the 2007 Women's World Cup.

Summary

Men's tournament

Roster

Group play

Women's tournament

Roster

Group play

Quarterfinals

Semifinals

Gold medal game

Gymnastics

Artistic
The United States qualified a full complement of six men and six women in artistic gymnastics. Two members of the U.S. men's gymnastics team, Paul Hamm and Jonathan Horton, were named at the conclusion of the Olympic Trials. The rest of the team was announced on Sunday, June 22. Because of the injury of his hand and shoulder, Paul Hamm withdrew from the Olympic team on July 28, 2008, and was replaced by alternate Raj Bhavsar. Additionally, Morgan Hamm withdrew from competition on August 7 because of an ankle injury, being replaced by Alexander Artemev.

Two members of the U.S. women's gymnastics team, Shawn Johnson and Nastia Liukin, were named at the end of the Olympic Trials on June 22. The remaining members were not named at the Trials, although Chellsie Memmel, Samantha Peszek and Alicia Sacramone were projected to be on the team. This left one spot vacant. The complete team was not announced until the conclusion of the women's selection camp at the Karolyi Camp near Houston, Texas, on July 17.

Men
Team

Individual finals

Women
Team

* Due to injury, Chellsie Memmel and Samantha Peszek could only compete on the uneven bars.
** Only two gymnasts per country may advance to a final.

Individual finals

Trampoline
Two trampolinists competed for the United States in Beijing. Chris Estrada became the first U.S. male in trampoline. Additionally, the United States had representatives in both men's and women's events for the first time. The U.S. has yet to have an athlete advance past the qualification stage.

Judo

USA Judo announced their 2008 U.S. Olympic Team on June 18, 2008, following trials at the Thomas & Mack Center in Las Vegas, Nevada. Seven men and three women represented the United States in Judo. On August 13, 2008, Ronda Rousey became the ninth American athlete and the first American woman to win a medal in Olympic Judo.

Men

Women

Modern pentathlon

Sheila Taormina, Margaux Isaksen and Eli Bremer were nominated to the pentathlon team after the U.S. was allocated three invitations by the Union Internationale de Pentathlon Moderne (UIPM), modern pentathlon's world governing body. On the second allocation, both Sam Sacksen and Dennis Bowsher were offered bids by the UIPM. Since one man was already on the squad, only one other slot was available. The U.S. used World Cup rankings to determine who would be on the squad and who would be named alternate. Bowsher appealed the decision but his claim was denied.

On the men's team, U.S. Olympic Training Center residents Eli Bremer and Sam Sacksen both made their Olympic modern pentathlon debuts. They struggled early, with disappointing scores in shooting (10 m air pistol) and fencing (épée one touch). For the women's team, 16-year-old Margaux Isaksen joined Sheila Taormina, the first woman to appear in the Olympics in three different sports. Like the men, Isaksen and Toarmina started off slowly, failing to rank higher than 24th in either shooting or fencing. Taormina, however, finished strongly, taking first place in riding (show jumping) and setting a modern pentathlon Olympic record in swimming (200 m freestyle). The U.S. did not medal in modern pentathlon.

Rowing

Thirteen crews represented the United States at the 2008 Olympic Games in Beijing, China.

Men

Women

Qualification Legend: FA=Final A (medal); FB=Final B (non-medal); FC=Final C (non-medal); FD=Final D (non-medal); FE=Final E (non-medal); FF=Final F (non-medal); SA/B=Semifinals A/B; SC/D=Semifinals C/D; SE/F=Semifinals E/F; QF=Quarterfinals; R=Repechage

Sailing

The United States qualified in all 11 Olympic sailing classes and sent 18 athletes to the races in Qingdao, China. Laser Radial sailor Anna Tunnicliffe and Finn sailor Zach Railey became the first American sailors to win Olympic medals in their respective classes since 1992.

Men

Women

Open

M = Medal race; EL = Eliminated – did not advance into the medal race; CAN = Race cancelled; DNF = Did not finish; DSQ = Disqualified; OCS = On course side; BFD = Black flag disqualification

Shooting

Men

* Jason Turner originally finished fourth, behind Kim Jong Su of North Korea. On August 15, 2008, the International Olympic Committee announced Kim had tested positive for the banned substance propranolol and thus stripped of his medals from the 2008 Summer Olympics. As a result, Turner was moved up to bronze in 10 m air pistol.

Women

Softball

The team roster for USA Softball was released on March 28, 2008. It included a fifteen-person team roster and a replacement roster of three players. The United States brought an impressive softball record to Beijing, winning every Olympic and world title since 1982. Prior to Beijing, it had a record of 106–10 in World Championships and 32–4 in the Olympics. It had won all three Olympic gold medals in softball, and outscored opponents 51–1 in Athens.

But at the Beijing Olympics, the United States lost to Japan 3–1 (after winning 7-0 in the round-robin) in the gold medal game. Japanese pitcher Yukiko Ueno had an outstanding performance after pitching 21 innings the day before. Following the surprise loss, the top three teams spelled "2016" using softballs in front of home plate in the hopes of Olympic reinstatement.

Summary

Roster
 Monica Abbott
 Laura Berg
 Crystl Bustos
 Andrea Duran
 Jennie Finch
 Tairia Flowers
 Vicky Galindo
 Lovieanne Jung
 Kelly Kretschman
 Lauren Lappin
 Caitlin Lowe
 Jessica Mendoza
 Stacey Nuveman
 Cat Osterman
 Natasha Watley

Head coach
 Mike Candrea
Assistant coaches
 Chuck D'Arcy
 Karen Jonhs
 John Rittman
Replacement roster
 Lisa Fernandez
 Alicia Hollowell
 Jenny Topping

Group stage All times are China Standard Time (UTC+8)

The top four teams will advance to the semifinal round.

Final group standings

Semifinal

Gold medal game

Official Olympic softball schedule

Swimming

The United States Olympic Team Trials in Swimming were held on June 29 – July 6 in Omaha, Nebraska. The U.S. sent two people in each individual discipline and up to six people for the 4x100 freestyle relays and 4x200 freestyle relays. On August 1, Jessica Hardy, who had qualified in the 100 meter breaststroke and the 50 meter freestyle, withdrew from the Olympic team after failing an anti-doping test at the national trials. Hardy opted to pull out instead of contesting the test results at the Court of Arbitration for Sport.

The U.S. left Beijing with 31 swimming medals: 12 gold, 9 silver and 10 bronze. This surpassed the 28 medals won by the swimming team in Athens. In the process, the U.S. broke ten swimming world records and twenty-four American records. The American performance in swimming was highlighted by Michael Phelps, who won a total of eight gold medals, surpassing Mark Spitz's 36-year-old single Games record of seven gold medals. Phelps also surpassed Spitz, Larisa Latynina of the USSR, Paavo Nurmi of Finland, and American sprinter Carl Lewis to become the current record holder for the most Olympic gold medals (fourteen). All three men's relay teams set world records, and an additional six individual world records were set by Phelps, Ryan Lochte and Aaron Peirsol.

The United States also saw milestones in women's swimming. Natalie Coughlin won six medals, more than any other female swimmer in Beijing., and the most for any American female athlete in a single Olympics. Rebecca Soni set a world record in the 200 meter breaststroke. Dara Torres, who won 3 silver medals after her eight-year absence, became the oldest Olympic swimmer to win a medal, at age 41.
 Qualifiers for the latter rounds of swimming events were decided on a time only basis, therefore positions shown are overall results versus competitors in all heats.

Men

* Competed in the heats only

Women

* Competed in the heats only

Synchronized swimming

One of the first sports in which the U.S. qualified for Beijing and formalized its Olympic roster was synchronized swimming. Berths in the duet and team events were secured at the 2007 Pan American Games. After winning both duet and team bronze medals in Athens, the U.S. failed to win a medal for the second time since synchronized swimming became an Olympic sport in 1984.

*Team captain

Table tennis

The United States qualified for the women's team competition, 3 places in women's singles, and 1 place in men's singles. Gao Jun and Wang Chen automatically qualified in women's singles by being in the top 20 International Table Tennis Federation (ITTF) world rankings. Yao "Crystal" Huang took the third and final North American women's spot by winning at the North American Trials in Vancouver, qualifying an American women's team in the process. David Zhuang secured the only American spot in men's singles at the North American Trials.

The entire American team was composed of Chinese-born athletes. This included Gao Jun, doubles silver medalist for China at the 1992 Olympics, who competed as an American for the third time. Although she failed to obtain a medal, Wang Chen became the first American player to advance to the quarter-finals in Olympic table tennis history after defeating 2004 Olympic bronze medalist Kim Kyung-Ah. The fifth-place performance by the women's team was also the best finish for U.S in this sport.

Singles

Team

Taekwondo

The United States sent the maximum of four athletes to compete in taekwondo; the team was announced after the final phase of the 2008 U.S. Olympic Trials for taekwondo on April 5, 2008. Diana, Mark and Steven López became the first trio from the same family to compete for the United States since 1904. All three of them won medals: one silver and two bronze. Steven López, a defending two-time Olympic gold medalist, lost his only match in six years after a controversial point deduction in the quarterfinals.

Tennis

The United States Tennis Association (USTA) formally announced the American Olympic team for tennis on June 26, 2008. Because of a nagging knee injury, Lindsay Davenport withdrew from the women's singles competition on August 8, 2008, although she still played in women's doubles. In a last-minute decision, Jill Craybas was selected to participate in her first Olympics at age 34.

After losing all eight previous matches against Roger Federer, James Blake defeated him in a surprise upset in the quarterfinals of men's singles. But Federer went on to beat the top-ranked American twins Bob and Mike Bryan in the doubles semifinals. Blake finished in fourth place after losing the bronze medal match to Novak Djokovic, while the Bryan twins won a bronze medal by defeating Arnaud Clément and Michaël Llodra. Venus Williams, 2008 Wimbledon champion, and her sister Serena were both upset in the quarterfinals of women's singles. However, they went on to win the gold in doubles over Anabel Medina Garrigues and Virginia Ruano Pascual, and in improving the sisters' Olympic record to 10–0.

Men

Women

Triathlon

From September 2007 to April 2008, the U.S. held three selection events, with the top American man and woman securing a place on the U.S. Olympic team. The U.S. qualified the maximum of three women and three men in Olympic triathlon, following the Vancouver BG Triathlon World Championships in June 2008 and the world rankings released by the International Triathlon Union. Americans have medaled once since triathlon was added to the Olympic program in 2000: a bronze in Athens.

Volleyball

Beach

Indoor

The United States was one of nine NOCs that managed to qualify a team in both then men's and the women's tournaments. The men's team won all their matches in the tournament, and earned the gold medal. The women's team won all group matches but one, and qualified to the final round, where they continued the winning streak until losing the gold medal match, ending the tournament with the silver medal.

Summary

Men's tournament

Roster

Group play

Quarterfinal

Semifinal

Gold medal match

Women's tournament

Roster

Group play

Quarterfinal

Semifinal

Gold medal match

Water polo

United States participated in both the men's and women's tournaments. Both teams won the silver medal.

Summary

Men's tournament

The United States men's water polo team qualified for Beijing by winning the 2007 Pan American Games tournament, held July 21–26 in Rio de Janeiro, Brazil. The 13-man Olympic roster was set by U.S. head coach Terry Schroeder on June 30. For the first time since 1988, the American men reached the finals of the water polo tournament. They won the silver after a loss to the two-time defending gold medalists from Hungary.

Roster

Group play

All times are China Standard Time (UTC+8).

Semifinal

Final

Women's tournament

The United States women's water polo team qualified for Beijing by winning the 2007 Pan American Games tournament, held July 14–20 in Rio de Janeiro, Brazil.
The U.S. Olympic roster of 13 was named by head coach Guy Baker on June 30. In Beijing, the American women won their second silver medal in the last three Olympics. The U.S. also became the only nation to medal in all three Olympics featuring women's water polo.

Roster

Group play

All times are China Standard Time (UTC+8).

Semifinal

Final

Weightlifting

The USA Weightlifting trials were held on May 25 in Atlanta, Georgia. The initial team included seven competitors and two alternates. Casey Burgener was originally selected to lift at the +105 kg event after the USOC reported that the International Weightlifting Federation offered the United States a third men's Olympic slot. The third slot never materialized, and the United States was not placed on the start list for the +105 event. The best U.S. hope for a weightlifting medal was expected to be Melanie Roach, who set a new American record and finished in sixth place.

Men

Women

Wrestling

The United States qualified in all weight classes except the 60 kg men's Greco-Roman. A total of sixteen wrestlers represented the U.S. in Beijing, winning three medals: two bronze and one gold. Henry Cejudo became the youngest wrestler ever to win Olympic gold, aged 21. His record was broken by Kyle Snyder in 2016.

Men's freestyle

Men's Greco-Roman

Women's freestyle

See also
United States at the 2007 Pan American Games
United States at the 2008 Summer Paralympics

References

External links

 Official website of the United States Olympic Committee and Team USA
 NBC Olympics coverage

Nations at the 2008 Summer Olympics
2008
Summer Olympics